Börje Ekholm (born 1963) is a Swedish business executive and CEO of Ericsson. He graduated in 1988 with an MSC in Electrical Engineering from KTH Royal Institute of Technology in Stockholm, Sweden
and holds a Master of Business Administration degree from INSEAD.

Career

Ekholm Has held several leadership positions:
 CEO of Ericsson since January 16, 2017.
 CEO of Patricia Industries from 2015 to January 15th, 2017
 CEO of Investor AB (Patricia's parent company) from 2005 to 2015

He sits on the boards of Alibaba, Nasdaq, Inc., Trimble, and the Royal Institute of Technology.

References

1963 births
Living people
Swedish engineers
KTH Royal Institute of Technology alumni
INSEAD alumni
Swedish chief executives
Ericsson people
Alibaba Group people
Members of the Royal Swedish Academy of Engineering Sciences